Lentz–Carter Merchandise Store, also known as Lentz–Carter Building, is a historic general store located at Stella, Newton County, Missouri. It was built in 1890, and is a two-story, frame building sheathed in clapboard. It measures approximately 60 feet by 22 feet, sits on a limestone foundation, and has a gable roof. It features an intact original storefront. It is the oldest building standing in Stella.

It was listed on the National Register of Historic Places in 2008.

References

Commercial buildings on the National Register of Historic Places in Missouri
Commercial buildings completed in 1890
Buildings and structures in Newton County, Missouri
National Register of Historic Places in Newton County, Missouri